Irazoqui is a surname. Notable people with the surname include:

Enrique Irazoqui (1944–2020), Spanish actor
Sebastián Irazoqui (born 1969), Argentine rugby union player